The following lists events that happened during 2012 in Guinea-Bissau.

Incumbents
President: 
 until 9 January: Malam Bacai Sanhá
 9 January-12 April: Adiato Djaló Nandigna (acting)
 12 April-11 May: Mamadu Ture Kuruma
 starting 11 May: Manuel Serifo Nhamadjo
Prime Minister: 
 until 10 February: Carlos Gomes Júnior
 10 February-12 April: Adiato Djaló Nandigna
 12 April-16 May: vacant 
 starting 16 May: Rui Duarte de Barros

Events

January
 January 9 - President Malam Bacai Sanhá dies at the age of 64 while undergoing treatment for an unknown ailment in Paris.

March
 March 18 - Voters in Guinea-Bissau go to the polls for a presidential election following the death of President Malam Bacai Sanhá in January.

April
 April 13 - The Economic Community of West African States condemns an apparent coup d'état in Guinea-Bissau.
 April 16 - Military leaders and a group of political parties in Guinea-Bissau announce the formation of a Transitional National Council after the recent coup; the acting president and prime minister remain in detention.
 April 17 - Guinea-Bissau is suspended from the African Union one week after a coup d'état.
 April 20 - The Economic Community of West African States condemns the election plan of the military junta which seized power in Guinea-Bissau.

October
 October 21 - A firefight in Guinea-Bissau kills six people.

References

 
Years of the 21st century in Guinea-Bissau
Guinea-Bissau
Guinea-Bissau
2010s in Guinea-Bissau